Pabre is a department or commune of Kadiogo Province in central Burkina Faso. Its capital lies at the town of Pabre.

Towns and villages

Pabré department is composed of 21 villages.

Bendatoèga
Bidougou
Bigtogo
Bilgo
Dabare
Gaskaye
Goupana
Katabtenga
Koankin
Kodemmtore
Napamboum
Nédogo
Pabré Centre
Pabré Saint Joseph
Sanbtenga
Saag-Nionniongo
Sallé
Wouavougué
Yamba
Zibako
Zouma

References

Departments of Burkina Faso
Kadiogo Province